Lačna Gora is a settlement in the southern Pohorje Hills north of Oplotnica in eastern Slovenia. The area is part of the traditional Styria region. The Municipality of Oplotnica is now included in the Drava Statistical Region.

References

External links
Lačna Gora on Geopedia

Populated places in the Municipality of Oplotnica